Two lunar eclipses occurred in 1954: 

 19 January 1954 total lunar eclipse
 16 July 1954 partial lunar eclipse

See also 
 List of 20th-century lunar eclipses
 Lists of lunar eclipses